Chickering may refer to:

 Chickering, Suffolk, a place in Suffolk, England
 Chickering & Sons, the piano company that was created by Jonas Chickering
 Arthur M. Chickering, an arachnologist
 Arthur W. Chickering, a researcher of student development theories
 Charles R. Chickering, an American illustrator and stamp designer
 Elmer Chickering, an American photographer
 Jonas Chickering, an American piano manufacturer
 Lawrence Chickering, Hoover Institute public policy analyst, Lawyer
 Roger Chickering, historian